DISCUS, or distributed source coding using syndromes, is a method for distributed source coding. It is a compression algorithm used to compress correlated data sources.  The method is designed to achieve the Slepian–Wolf bound by using channel codes.

History

DISCUS was invented by researchers S. S.  Pradhan and K. Ramachandran, and first published in their
paper "Distributed source coding using syndromes (DISCUS): design and construction",
published in the  IEEE Transactions on Information Theory in 2003.

Variations
Many variations of DISCUS are presented in related literature. One such popular scheme is the Channel Code Partitioning scheme, which is an a-priori scheme, to reach the Slepian–Wolf bound. Many papers illustrate simulations and experiments on channel code partitioning using the turbo codes, Hamming codes and irregular repeat-accumulate codes.

See also 

 Modulo-N code is a simpler technique for compressing correlated data sources.
 Distributed source coding

External links 

 "Distributed source coding using syndromes (DISCUS): design and construction" by Pradhan, S.S. and Ramchandran, K.
 "DISCUS: Distributed Compression for Sensor Networks"
 Distributed Source Coding can also be implemented using Convolutional Codes or using Turbo Codes

Information theory
Wireless sensor network